Nicolas Gessner (born 17 August 1931, in Budapest, Hungary) is a Hungarian-born filmmaker who mostly worked in France.

His movies are often characterized by strange, quirky atmospheres and unusual cast mixing French and international actors. Starting from the early 1980s, Gessner mostly worked for television.

Filmography
Auskunft im Cockpit (1959)
Der Gefangene der Botschaft (1964, TV film)
Diamonds Are Brittle (1965)
The Blonde from Peking (1967)
The Thirteen Chairs (1969)
Someone Behind the Door (1971)
The Little Girl Who Lives Down the Lane (1976)
It Rained All Night the Day I Left (1980)
Herr Herr (1982, TV film)
Le tueur triste (1984, TV film)
Intrigues (1985, TV series)
Macho (1986, TV film)
Das andere Leben (1987, TV film)
 (1988)
Tennessee Waltz (1989)
Visages suisses (1991)
Estelle (1993, TV miniseries)
Chêques en boîte (1994, TV film)
Spaceship Earth (Tous sur orbite !) (1997, TV series)

References

External links
 

1931 births
Living people
20th-century Hungarian people
Hungarian film directors
Swiss film directors
Film people from Budapest